Vitals Global Healthcare (VGH) is a healthcare company based in Malta.  It manages Public–private partnerships and works with Barts and The London School of Medicine and Dentistry.

Bid 

In 2014 it "formulated a bid for the management and administration of a number of hospitals in the Maltese Islands".

Contract terms 

VGH had a 30 year concession on healthcare services in the Gozo, and St Lukes hospitals and was paid €49.5 million by the Government of Malta in 2016 and 2017.

Ownership 

VGH ownership was said to be the "Bluestone Group" however it now appears it was controlled by the Bluestone Special Situations #4 Limited (BVI) which in turn is owned by BVI company Asia Harimau Investments Ltd which is owned by Mark Edward Pawley, a senior advisor to Oxley Capital Group.

Other parties received share option agreements granting them rights to percentages of shares in VGH without showing up as owners of VGH.

When VGH Malta was created, an identically named company was established in Jersey, together with 11 other companies, Sri Ram Tumuluri is named as an investor who created the Jersey companies.  The Jersey companies included ones designed to support a bid for a similar style VGH hospital projects in Kosovo and Montenegro.

Cash flow problems 

In August 2017, Kexby Finance Limited which had lent Asia Harimau Investments money in April 2016 asked the BVI courts to declare Asia Harimau Investments bankrupt, documents filed showed that when the initial acquisition by VGH was undertaken there was insufficient funds available to fund the initial €500,000 consultancy bills resulting in borrowings from Dr Amrish Gupta.

In 2017 VGH was paid €75 million to run the hospitals, but incurred costs of €94 million, resulting in a loss of €18 million, up from a loss of €6 million in 2016.

Sale to Steward Global Healthcare 

VGH was sold to Steward Global Healthcare in January 2018 for a nominal €1, the sale precipitated a doctors' strike.

VGH received €50 million from the Maltese government to allow the sale to go through.

Controversy 

VGH was being investigated by investigative journalist Daphne Caruana Galizia before her murder in October 2017.

Three Maltese Government Ministers at the time, Edward Scicluna, Chris Cardona and Konrad Mizzi, face investigation regarding VGH taking control of the three hospitals under a contract to last for 30 years in 2015. 

Accusations that the bidding process was skewed, with the bidding process announcing 3 bids, one of which was only a letter of non-interest, the second was from a small company operating a single hospital in India and VGH. The contract terms were also considered biased with the government having to bail out VGH if it got into debt and it would cost €100 million plus pay company debts to buy the contract back.

See also
 2019 Malta political crisis

References

Health care companies of Malta